Sarah Rapelje  (9 June 1625 – 1685) was the first European Christian female born in New Netherland.

Biography
Sarah Rapelje was the daughter of Joris Jansen Rapelje (1604-1663) and Catalina Trico (1605-1689), who were Walloon Calvinists who sailed on board the ship Eendracht from the Dutch Republic in 1624. The Rapeljes arrived at a site along the Hudson River where they helped build one of the first Dutch settlements, Fort Orange, where Sarah Rapelje was born on June 9, 1625 along the Waaleboght. Fort Orange would eventually become the fur-trading town of Beverwijck, which itself would later become Albany, New York. In 1626, Manhattan Island near the mouth of the Hudson River was bought by Dutch settlers from local Native Americans, and the Rapelje family were sent to help with the settlement of New Amsterdam on the island's southern tip. Joris Rapelje later bought land on Long Island, across the East River from New Amsterdam, in the village of Breuckelen (the basis of modern Brooklyn) and eventually moved to Wallabout Bay. 

Sarah Rapelje married Hans Hansen Bergen in 1639 with whom she had eight children, seven of whom lived into adulthood, until Bergen died in 1653. In 1654 Rapelje married Teunis Gysbertse Bogaert (b. 1625, Heicop, Dutch Republic - d. 1699, Breuckelen, New York) with whom she had seven more children. Through their youngest child and only son, Guysbert, she is the 7th-great grandmother of actor Humphrey Bogart. On April 24, 1660, New Netherland Governor Peter Stuyvesant named Bogaert a magistrate of New Amersfoort and Midwood. In 1663, Bogaert was appointed a magistrate in Breuckelen, succeeding his father-in-law Joris Jansen Rapelje, serving in that capacity until 1673. Bogaert also served as a magistrate of Bushwick between 1664 and 1665, and was a representative of Breuckelen in the Hempstead Convention of 1665.

Rapelje died in 1685 in Boswijck, a village that became the modern Bushwick neighborhood of Brooklyn. By the time Rapelje died the New Netherland colony had been ceded to the English in 1664, and was rebranded the Province of New York.

Legacy
Rapelje's chair is in the permanent collection of the Museum of the City of New York, a gift of her Brinckerhoff descendants. Brooklyn's Rapelye Street is named after the family. Sarah Rapelje herself was granted a large tract of land in the Wallabout in Brooklyn by Dutch authorities for being the first European Christian female to be born in the New Netherland. The family owned extensive property in the area of present-day Red Hook.

Her descendants include British television presenter Clare Balding, Humphrey Bogart,  Tom Brokaw, Governor Howard Dean, Royal Baking Powder Company president Joseph C. Hoagland (1841-1899) and Grammy-winning musician Mark O'Connor.

References

External links
 Sarah Rapalje (1625–1685), The New Netherland Institute
 The Hidden History of the Rapeljes, Urban Environmentalist NYC, gowanuslounge.com
 The History of Brooklyn Navy Yard
 The Rapelje Family, The Baltimore Sun
 The Rapelje Property, on the Brooklyn & Jamaica Rail Road, New York Public Library Digital Gallery
 The Rapelje Estate, Foot of 35th Street, North River, New York Public Library Digital Gallery
 Rapelje Avenue, Queens, New York, New York Public Library Digital Gallery
 Rapelyea House, New York Public Library Digital Gallery
 Rapelyea Estate, New York Public Library Digital Gallery

Related Reading
Bergen, Teunis G, (1866) The Bergen Family: or The Descendants of Hans Hansen Bergen, One of the Early Settlers of New York and Brooklyn  (New York City: Bergen & Tripp)  
Fosdick, Lucian John (1906) The French Blood in America (Boston, Mass.: R. G. Badger) 
Ross, Peter (1902) A History of Long Island: From Its Earliest Settlement to the Present Time, Volume 2 (Lewis publishing Company - Long Island,  N.Y.)
Stiles, Henry Reed (1867) A History of the City of Brooklyn, Volume 1'' (Published by subscription in Brooklyn, NY)

1625 births
1685 deaths
People of New Netherland
Bergen family